Island Lake may refer to:

Lakes
 Island Lake (Antarctica)
 Island Lake (Alberta), Alberta
 Island Lake (Manitoba), Manitoba
 Big Island Lake (Manitoba), Manitoba

United States 
 Island Lake (Idaho), in the Sawtooth Wilderness
 Island Lake (White Cloud Mountains), in Custer County, Idaho
 Island Lake (Illinois)
 Island Lake (Aitkin County, Minnesota)
 Island Lake (Beltrami County, Minnesota)
 Island Lake (Lyon County, Minnesota), Lyon County, Minnesota
 Island Lake (Lincoln County, Montana), in Lincoln County, Montana
 Island Lake (Missoula County, Montana), in Missoula County, Montana
 Island Lake (Stillwater County, Montana), in Stillwater County, Montana
 Island Lake (Nevada)
 Island Lake (Oregon)

Places

Canada 
 Island Lake, Algoma District, a community and settlement in northeast Ontario, located within the Aweres local service board
 Island Lake, Manitoba, a small community in east–central / northeast Manitoba
 Island Lake, Sudbury District, a community and settlement in northeast Ontario, located near Chapleau

United States 
 Island Lake, Illinois, a village in the far northwest Chicago suburbs
 Island Lake, Beltrami County, Minnesota
 Island Lake, St. Louis County, Minnesota, an unincorporated community near the city of Duluth
 Island Lake Township, Lyon County, Minnesota, a township in southwest Minnesota
 Island Lake Township, Mahnomen County, Minnesota, a township in northwest Minnesota
 Island Lake, Wisconsin, an unincorporated community near Ladysmith

See also
 Island Pond (disambiguation)
 Island Lakes in the Alpine Lakes Wilderness of Washington State